Kansei is a Japanese era name.

Kansei may also refer to:

 Kansei calendar, a Japanese lunisolar calendar
 Kansei engineering, a method for translating feelings and impressions into product parameters
 Kansei Edict, a document that banned any teaching or propagation of heterodox studies
 Kansei Nakano, a Japanese politician
 Kansei Reforms, a series of Japanese reactionary policy changes
 Calsonic Kansei, Japanese automotive company